Love Punch is the debut album by Ai Otsuka released on 31 March 2004 under the Avex Trax  record label. This album was released in two formats: a CD Only version and a CD+DVD version. The CD+DVD edition comes with a DVD containing promo clips and interviews. Initial pressings contained a limited edition picture book. The album reached #3 on the Oricon charts and stayed on the charts for a total of 98 weeks. Because the album sold 519,300 copies in 2004, it became the #20 most popular album of 2004. However, it also charted on the 2005 end-of-year charts at #94 as it sold 159,025 copies in that year as well. In total, this album has sold 698,277 units.

Track listing

References

2004 debut albums
Ai Otsuka albums
Avex Group albums